George Oldroyd Borwick DSO (7 March 1879 – 27 June 1964) was a Conservative Party politician in the United Kingdom.

He was elected at the 1918 general election as Member of Parliament (MP) for Croydon North, but stepped down at the 1922 election. He did not stand for Parliament again.

He was awarded a DSO in 1917.

References

External links 
 

1879 births
1964 deaths
Companions of the Distinguished Service Order
Conservative Party (UK) MPs for English constituencies
Politics of the London Borough of Croydon
UK MPs 1918–1922